Porikkal is a village in the Kadagaman Panchayat, Tiruvannamalai taluk, Tiruvannamalai district. It is in the Kilpennathur (state assembly constituency) and Tiruvannamalai (Lok Sabha constituency).

Cities and towns in Tiruvannamalai district